Turnabout is an American sitcom that first aired on NBC in 1979 and was based on a 1931 novel of the same title by Thorne Smith (which had already been developed into the 1940 movie, Turnabout). The plot was about a husband and wife who found themselves inhabiting each other's bodies. The series lasted seven episodes.

Plot
Sports writer Sam Alston (John Schuck) and his cosmetics-executive wife Penny (Sharon Gless) each envy the other's life. One day, Penny buys a small statue from a gypsy and the statue turns out to have the magical power to grant wishes. The next morning, Sam and Penny each discover that they have switched bodies. Once they realize that the switch is not going to simply wear off, they both try to adjust without letting anyone know about it: Sam discovers what it is like to live as a woman and Penny as a man.

Episodes

TV-movie
Four episodes of the series — "Turnabout," "Penny's Old Boyfriend," "Till Dad Do Us Part," and "Statutory Theft" — were compiled into a single TV-movie titled Magic Statue.

Sources

References

1979 American television series debuts
1979 American television series endings
1970s American sitcoms
NBC original programming
Television series by Universal Television
Television shows set in Pittsburgh